Caledonia/Grand River Water Aerodrome  was located  west of Caledonia, Ontario, Canada.

References

Defunct seaplane bases in Ontario